The   Dr. Vithalrao Vikhe Patil College Of Engineering, mostly known as D.V.V.P. College of Engineering Ahmednagar. was established in 1983 in the Ahmednagar industrial area. It offers undergraduate and postgraduate courses. Its UG courses are accredited by National Board of Accreditation, New Delhi.

The institution is affiliated to Savitribai Phule Pune University, Pune, recognized by the Government of Maharashtra & approved by AICTE (All India Council for Technical Education), New Delhi.>

References

Engineering colleges in Maharashtra
Education in Ahmednagar district
Ahmednagar
1983 establishments in Maharashtra
Educational institutions established in 1983